is a train station in the city of Toyama, Toyama Prefecture, Japan.

Lines

Station layout 
The station has one ground-level island platform serving two tracks. The station is staffed.

Platforms

History
It was renamed to its present name on 21 September 1945. A new station building was completed in March 2010.

Adjacent stations

Surrounding area 
 Dai-Ichi High School

See also
 List of railway stations in Japan

External links

 

Railway stations in Toyama Prefecture
Railway stations in Japan opened in 1931
Stations of Toyama Chihō Railway
Toyama (city)